Whittall Mansion) is an Ottoman-era mansion in Istanbul, Turkey. It was built in 1900. Today, it is the house museum of the rock musician Barış Manço (1943 - 1999).

Background
James William Whittall, later Sir William Whittall, was a British businessman, whose ancestors settled in Smyrna, today İzmir, in 1809. He married fellow Anglo-Ottoman Edith Anne Barker in Buca, Smyrna on 9 April 1862. His wife gave birth to four children, Edith Mary, Ethel Marianne, Frederick Edwin and Linda Frances.

After working with his two brothers in the family-owned firm C. Whittall and Co. in Smyrna, he founded his own company in Constantinople, today Istanbul, in 1873.

Mansion
The Whittall Mansion is located on Yusuf Kamil Paşa St. in the Moda quarter of Kadıköy district in Istanbul, Turkey. In 1870, J.W. Whittall purchased a large property in Moda, Kadıköy stretching on a hillside between Moda Avenue and the sea shore of the Marmara Sea. He built a mansion for his grown-up family, designed by Ottoman Greek Pape between 1895 and 1900. The mansion was dubbed the "Tower House" ("Kule Ev"). He bestowed a wooden house at the premises to his son Frederick Edwin and daughter-in-law Helen, née La Fontaine.  He built houses of all sizes on the property for his children.

Soldier and civil servant Mahmud Muhtar Pasha fled to the Whittall mansion for shelter in April 1909 amidst the chaos of the 31 March Incident; the house was briefly surrounded by Ottoman troops.

The Whittall Mansion has two stories and an attic. The first floor features a long hall stretching to the terrace. The hall was flanked by living rooms. One of the rooms, having a charcoal-burning stove and decorated as an "Oriental Room", belonged to Helen's grandmother Lilly, who played pinochle there. There were about six Aubusson tapestries hanging on the walls. The tapestries were bought by Enver Pasha during World War I, and holes were punched in the middle to allow stove pipes to go through, for stoves to warm wounded Turkish soldiers in the hospital. On the second floor were the sleeping rooms. The terrace overlooked the lower garden with some magnolia trees and a small jetty on the sea shore, where J.W. Whittall moored sailboats. The hillside garden was dubbed "Whittall Park".

History

The mansion changed ownership many times. In 1965, fifth generation family member John Whittall regained possession of the mansion. In 1984, rock musician Barış Manço (1943 - 1999) purchased it. After Manço's death, the mansion, where he had lived with his wife Lale and sons Doğukan Hazar and Batıkan Zorbey and produced his works, was restored and turned into a museum focused on his life.. It was opened to the public on 9 June 2010.

See also 

 Edward Whittall

References

Ottoman architecture in Istanbul
Buildings and structures of the Ottoman Empire
Mansions in Turkey
Houses completed in 1900
Historic house museums in Turkey
Museums established in 2010
2010 establishments in Turkey
Kadıköy
19th-century architecture in Turkey